Thomas William Hislop  (8 April 1850 – 2 October 1925) was the Mayor of Wellington from 1905 to 1908, and had represented two South Island electorates in the New Zealand Parliament.

Early life

He was born in Kirknewton, West Lothian in 1850. His father, John Hislop, was the first secretary for Education in New Zealand. The family left Scotland in 1856 on the Strathmore and landed in Port Chalmers. They settled in East Taieri. He was educated by his father until the age of twelve, and then attended John Shaw's Grammar School (Albany Street, Dunedin), Dunedin High School and University of Otago, where he studied law. He was admitted as a barrister and solicitor in 1871, only a few months after his teacher from Shaw's Grammar, Robert Stout (who later became Premier and then Chief Justice). He practised as a lawyer in Oamaru (in a firm where he was a colleague of Stout ), in which town he resided until 1890. After the 1890 election defeat, he moved to Wellington, where he became a partner in the legal firm of Brandon and Hislop (later Brandon, Hislop and Johnston) with Alfred Brandon.

Political career

He was first elected for the Waitaki electorate in the 1876 general election, and was re-elected in 1879. He resigned on 28 April 1880 "for private reasons". He then represented Oamaru from an 1885 by-election to 1889, when he resigned from his two ministerial portfolios (effective 10 September 1889) and his parliamentary seat (effective 4 September 1889) over the Ward–Hislop Affair. He won the resulting 1889 by-election, but was defeated by Thomas Young Duncan at the next general election in 1890. He contested the 1896 general election in the Wellington Suburbs electorate, but was defeated by Thomas Wilford, with 2194 to 1942 votes. An election petition was filed one month after the election, accusing Wilford of bribery, illegal practices and not being properly registered as a voter himself. Therefore, it was argued, that only Hislop was properly registered, and should thus be returned. Wilford's election was declared invalid, but a by-election was called. Hislop declared that he would not stand in the by-election in favour of the opposition candidate Arthur Atkinson, who had come forth in the three-member Wellington electorate. Charles Wilson from the Liberal Party narrowly defeated Atkinson in the 1897 by-election, though.

He was a member of the Atkinson Ministry from 1887 to 1891, holding posts as Colonial Secretary and Minister of Education. The education portfolio filled Hislop with great pleasure, as he was thus following in his father's footsteps, as he had been the author of the Education Act. Hislop drafted the Fair Rent Bill, which was introduced by the fifth Atkinson Ministry, and passed through the Lower House. He also introduced labour bills, factory and shop hours, and employers' liability bills, also building liens and the Truck Act, which, however, were not passed. He was successful in passing the Shipping and Seamen's Act. He also affected some useful legal reforms, and introduced the Representation Bill, a measure based on the Hare system, but this was withdrawn. Hislop's political views were on the left of the spectrum.

As a minister, he was involved in the 1889 Paris Exposition. For that, and for his services to education in general, he was honoured by the French Government with a Legion of Honour.

In 1902, the electorate was contested by William Henry Peter Barber, Hislop, Charles Luke, William Chapple and William George Tustin. They received 1385, 1357, 1100, 1017 and 159 votes, respectively. John Crewes had initially also contested the election, but he withdrew his nomination before polling day. The 1905 election was contested by William Henry Peter Barber, Hislop, William Chapple and Alfred Hindmarsh. They received 3231, 2018, 1795 and 383 votes, respectively.

Hislop was Mayor of Wellington from 1905 to 1908.

He was a Member of the Legislative Council from 1921 until his death.

Family and death
Hislop's last residence was Sayes Court in Aurora Terrace, Wellington. It was once described as the "most valuable residential property in the city of Wellington".

Hislop married Annie Simpson on 18 February 1873 at Knox Church in Dunedin. They had two sons and three daughters. His first wife died in 1909. His son Thomas Hislop was Mayor of Wellington from 1931 to 1944.

On 27 May 1922 at St Johns Church in Willis Street, he married Marguerite Estelle Louis Smith (known as Louis Smith) of Wellington.

Hislop died on 2 October 1925 at his residence. He was buried at Karori Cemetery in Wellington on 5 October of that year. He was survived by his second wife and his children.

List of honours
  Officier de la Légion d'Honneur (France)

Notes

References

 This article incorporates text from a publication now in the public domain: 
 Perry, Stuart (1969) No Mean City. Wellington City Council; includes a paragraph and a portrait or photo for each mayor.

|-

|-

1850 births
1925 deaths
Mayors of Wellington
Members of the Cabinet of New Zealand
19th-century New Zealand lawyers
Members of the New Zealand House of Representatives
Members of the New Zealand Legislative Council
Scottish emigrants to New Zealand
Officiers of the Légion d'honneur
New Zealand recipients of the Légion d'honneur
New Zealand MPs for South Island electorates
New Zealand education ministers
Independent MPs of New Zealand
Burials at Karori Cemetery
Unsuccessful candidates in the 1890 New Zealand general election
Unsuccessful candidates in the 1896 New Zealand general election
Unsuccessful candidates in the 1899 New Zealand general election
Unsuccessful candidates in the 1902 New Zealand general election
Unsuccessful candidates in the 1905 New Zealand general election
Unsuccessful candidates in the 1908 New Zealand general election
University of Otago alumni
People educated at Otago Boys' High School
Colonial Secretaries of New Zealand
19th-century New Zealand politicians